Decima can refer to:

 Decima gallery, a London-based arts organisation
 Decima (game engine), a proprietary game engine by Guerrilla Games
 Decima (mythology), a goddess in Roman mythology and one of the Parcae (Fates)
 Decima Research, a Canadian polling company
 Décima, a type of poetry with ten stanzas, rooted in Spanish literature
 Décima, the one-tenth tithe in Spain that is traditionally donated to a religious institution, the tithe itself called diezmo in Spanish
 Dejima, a foreign trading post off the coast of Nagasaki, Japan, during the 16th to 19th century
 SB Decima, a Thames barge built in 1899
 The Decimas, a race of fictional creatures in the British science-fiction television series Blake's 7
Decima Flottiglia MAS, an Italian flotilla, with commando frogman unit, of the Regia Marina (Italian Royal Navy) created during the Fascist regime